Plateau North Senatorial District in Plateau State covers six local government areas, namely  Barkin-Ladi, Bassa, Jos East, Jos North, Jos South, and Riyom. Plateau North is currently represented in the Senate by Istifanus Gyang of the People's Democratic Party, PDP.

List of senators representing Plateau North

References 

Plateau State
Senatorial districts in Nigeria